Unazuki Dam is a gravity dam located in Toyama prefecture in Japan. The dam is used for flood control, water supply and power production. The catchment area of the dam is 617.5 km2. The dam impounds about 88  ha of land when full and can store 24700 thousand cubic meters of water. The construction of the dam was started on 1974 and completed in 2000.

References

Dams in Toyama Prefecture
2000 establishments in Japan